The Honda Transalp is the XL400V, XL600V, XL650V, XL700V, and XL750 series of dual-sport motorcycles manufactured in Japan by Honda since 1987. With the exception of XL750, the Transalp bikes series feature a liquid-cooled, four-stroke 52° V-twin engine.

History 
The first prototype was built in 1985 as an off-road motorbike with a  engine.

Models 
The most usual models are:
 The XL600V from 1986 - available in the United States in 1989
 The XL650V from 2000
 The XL700V from 2008
 The XL750 from 2023

Other versions exist, such as the 400 cc version (ND-06) aimed at the Japanese market.

Later models returned to the original 50 hp.

From 1991, the rear drum brake was replaced by a  disc brake, with a single-piston brake caliper.

The appearance was altered in 1994: the original square lights were changed, and a new fairing was introduced.

In 1996, new 34 mm carburetors were introduced, and the CDI ignition system was replaced by a microprocessor-driven design.

In 2000, the XL650V Transalp replaced the XL600V, introducing the engine from the Deauville and Honda Revere. A 4 mm bore diameter increase gave a 64 cc displacement increase.

In 2007, the XL700V Transalp was introduced, with a new 680 cc engine, which was also fitted to the NT700V Deauville, and compatible with Euro 3 emission standards. The front wheel diameter was reduced from 21 inches to 19 inches, the exhaust system was fitted with a catalytic converter, the lights were redesigned, and ABS was introduced.

The 2008 model reinforces the road orientation of the Transalp, with larger tyres, lower saddle and more road-oriented shock absorbers. The 2008 XL700V engine is a liquid-cooled, eight-valve, four-stroke, single-overhead cam, 52° V-twin. The 2023 Honda XL750 Transalp engine is a 755 cc, Unicam 8-valve parallel twin that produced  and is shared with the CB750 Hornet.

References

External links

 XL700V Transalp at Honda UK

Transalp
Dual-sport motorcycles
Motorcycles introduced in 1987